Massimiliano Donati (born 16 June 1979) is an Italian former sprinter.

Biography
Donati won seven medals at the International athletics competitions, all of these with national relays team. He participated at one edition of the Summer Olympics (2004), he has 16 caps in national team from 1998 to 2007. He is the brother of Roberto Donati.

National titles
He has won 3 times the individual national championship.
1 win in the 60 metres indoor (2007)
2 wins in the 200 metres indoor (2004, 2005)

See also
 Italy national relay team

References

External links
 

1979 births
Living people
Italian male sprinters
Olympic athletes of Italy
Athletes (track and field) at the 2004 Summer Olympics
Athletics competitors of Fiamme Gialle
Universiade medalists in athletics (track and field)
World Athletics Championships athletes for Italy
Mediterranean Games gold medalists for Italy
Mediterranean Games medalists in athletics
Athletes (track and field) at the 2005 Mediterranean Games
Universiade gold medalists for Italy
Medalists at the 2001 Summer Universiade
Medalists at the 2005 Summer Universiade